Kasa-e-Dil is a 2020–21 Pakistani television series that premiered on 9 November 2020. Presentation of 7th Sky Entertainment owned by Abdullah Kadwani and Asad Qureshi, it is directed by Zeeshan Ahmed and written by Jahanzeb Qamar. It has Affan Waheed, Hina Altaf, Komal Aziz Khan, Ali Ansari and Sukaina Khan in lead roles.

Plot 
Hatim and Somia are first cousins and in love with each other but Hatim's mother (Somia's phupho) opposes their relationship. So on the mehndi day of Somia's brother she rejects the proposal of Hatim and Somia's marriage in front of Somia's parents due to which her father suffers a heart attack and dies. Later, Somia's brother Nauman marries Raheela (her other phupho’s daughter) but Raheela is in love with Hatim.

On the other side a rich businessman Adan falls in love with somia but is unable to confess his love. Rabia realises Adan’s feelings and in order to separate Hatim and Somia she took advantage of Adan's love for Somia. she created misunderstandings between Hatim and Somia which leads to Hatim leaving Somia on the day of their marriage function. Rabia sent Adan in Somia's room where Hatim saw them both and called off his marriage. Adan was shocked hearing all this and decided to marry Somia on the same day to protect her from all the insult. After marriage he requested Somia to wait in her home till he convinces his mother to which she agreed.

On reaching his house his mother emotional blackmailed him into marrying his cousin shireen who is head over heels in love with him because adan’s sister will marry shireen’s brother and her father puts a condition that this marriage will only take place if adan marries shireen. Adan after being emotionally blackmailed finally agrees after sometime he told shireen about his first marriage with somia and brings home somia but shireen troubles somia too much and becomes innocent in front of adan she creates misunderstandings between the too by bringing her past hatim. After all these misunderstandings adan discovers that somia is innocent and decided to leave his house with somia. But somia convinces him that they should stay with his mother only to which he reluctantly agreed. One day somia was making her tea then adan came from office so she left the tea and told the servant to bring her tea in her bedroom but instead of somia adan drinks the tea and fell on the ground later it was discovered that the tea had poison and shireen put poison in it. After coming home from hospital adan hears the conversation between shireen and his mother where her mother tells shireen to leave their house. After all this adan and somia lived happily with his mother

Cast 

 Hina Altaf as Somia
 Affan Waheed as Adan
 Komal Aziz Khan as Shireen
 Sukaina Khan as Raheela
 Rabia Noreen as Fehmida
 Zainab Qayyum as Somia's mother
 Shabbir Jan as Somia's father (cameo)
 Ali Ansari as Hatim
 Haris Waheed as Noman
 Maryam Noor as Najiya, Adan's sister
 Noor ul Hassan as Shireen's father
 Fazila Qazi as Adan's mother
 Tauqeer Ahmed as Aqsam, Najiya's husband
 Birjees Farooqui as Shaista, Raheela's mother
 Rehma Khalid as Sana, Shireen's friend

Soundtrack 

The original soundtrack of Kasa-e-Dil is sung by Sahir Ali Bagga and Hadiqa Kiani. The song composition and lyrics are also by Bagga.

References

External links 
 Kasa-e-Dil on Har Pal Geo
 Kasa-e-Dil on 7th Sky Entertainment

Pakistani drama television series
2020 Pakistani television series debuts
Pakistani romantic drama television series
Urdu-language television shows
Geo TV original programming